Queen Hyohyeon (27 April 1828 – 18 October 1843) (Hangul: 효현왕후 김씨, Hanja: 孝顯王后 金氏) of the Andong Kim clan, was the wife and the queen consort of King Heonjong of Joseon, the 24th monarch of the Joseon Dynasty. She was posthumously called as Hyohyeon, the Accomplishment Empress (효현성황후, 孝顯成皇后).

Biography
Lady Kim was born into the (new) Andong Kim clan (Hangul: 신 안동 김씨, Hanja: 新 安東 金氏) on 27 April 1828 in Ahnguk-bang District to Kim Jo-geun and Lady Yi of the Hansan Yi clan. 

Through her father, Lady Kim is a distant relative of Queen Inmok, Queen Sunwon, and Queen Cheorin. 

Lady Kim later became Queen Consort to the young King Heonjeong at the age of 10 in 1837. Her mother was given the royal title of “Internal Princess Consort Hanseong to the Internal Prince” (Hangul: 한성부부인 한산 이씨, Hanja: 漢城府夫人 韓山 李氏), and her father was given the royal title of “Internal Prince Yeongheung” (Hangul: 영흥부원군, Hanja: 永興府院君). The young Queen later died at the age of 15 in 1843 within Changdeok Palace’s Daejo Hall without offspring.

She is buried in Gyeongreung in Guri, Gyeonggi Province with King Heonjong and his second wife, Queen Hyojeong.

Family
 Great-Great-Great-Great-Great-Great-Grandfather
 Kim Gwang-chan (김광찬, 金光燦) (1597 - 24 February 1668)
 Great-Great-Great-Great-Great-Great-Grandmother
 Lady Kim of the Yeonan Kim clan (연안 김씨); daughter of Kim Nae (김래, 金琜)
 Great-Great-Great-Great-Great-Grandfather
 Kim Su-hang (김수항, 金壽恒) (1629 - 9 April 1689)
 Great-Great-Great-Great-Great-Grandmother 
 Lady Na of the Anjeong Na clan (안정 나씨); daughter of Na Seong-du (나성두)
 Great-Great-Great-Great-Grandfather
 Kim Chang-jib (김창집, 金昌集) (1648 - 2 May 1722)
 Great-Great-Great-Great-Grandmother
 Lady Park (박씨); daughter of Park Se-nam (박세남, 朴世楠)
 Great-Great-Great-Grandfather
 Kim Je-gyeom (김제겸, 金濟謙)
 Great-Great-Grandfather
 Kim Tan-haeng (김탄행, 金坦行) (1714 - 1774)
 Great-Great-Grandmother 
 Lady Han of the Cheongju Han clan (정경부인 청주 한씨, 貞敬夫人 淸州 韓氏); (한백증의 딸) daughter of Han Baek-jeung (한백증, 韓百增)
 Great-Grandfather
 Kim Yi-yu (김이유, 金履裕)
 Adoptive Great-Grandfather: Kim Yi-so (김이소, 金履素) (1735 - 1798)
 Great-Grandmother 
 Lady Yu of the Munhwa Yu clan (정부인 문화 유씨, 貞夫人 文化 柳氏)
 Grandfather
 Kim Ji-Sun (김지순, 金芝淳)
 Grandmother
 Lady Min of the Yeoheung Min clan (본관: 여흥 민씨, 驪興 閔氏); (민종현의 딸) daughter of Min Jong-hyeon (민종현, 閔鍾顯)
 Father
 Internal Prince Yeongheung, Duke Hyogan, Kim Jo-geun (영흥부원군 효간공 김조근, 永興府院君 孝簡公 金祖根) (1793 – 1844)
 Uncle: Kim Bo-geun (김보근, 金輔根) (1803 - 1869); became the adoptive son of Kim Hong-sun (김홍순, 金鴻淳)
 Mother
 Internal Princess Consort Hanseong of the Hansan Yi clan (한성부부인 한산 이씨, 漢城府夫人 韓山 李氏) 
 Maternal Grandfather: Yi Hui-Seon (이희선, 李羲先) (1775 – 1818)
 Maternal Grandmother: Lady Park of the Bannam Park clan (본관: 반남 박씨, 潘南 朴氏) (1774 – 1811); (박홍수의 딸) daughter of Park Hong-su (박홍수, 朴泓壽)
 Maternal Uncle: Yi Chang-jae (이창재, 李昌在) (1797 - 1863)
 Maternal Aunt: Lady Kim of the Andong Kim clan (정부인 안동 김씨, 貞夫人 安東 金氏) (1798 - 1871); (김봉순의 딸) daughter of Kim Bong-sun (김봉순, 金鳳淳)
 Maternal Uncle: Yi Gyeong-jae (이경재, 李景在) (1800 - 1873)
 Siblings
 Older brother: Kim Byeong-jib (김병집, 金炳潗)
 Adoptive nephew: Kim Gap-gyu (김갑규, 金甲圭); son of Kim Byeong-seo (김병서, 金炳敍)
 Older sister: Lady Kim of the Andong Kim clan (안동 김씨)
 Brother-in-law: Nam Byeong-cheol (남병철, 南秉哲) (1817 - 1863)
Husband
 King Heonjong of Joseon (8 September 1827 – 25 July 1849) (조선 헌종) — No issue.
 Mother-in-law: Queen Shinjeong of the Pungyang Jo clan (신정익황후 조씨, 神貞翼皇后 趙氏) (21 January 1809 - 4 June 1890)
 Father-in-law: King Munjo of Joseon (문조, 文祖) (18 September 1809 - 25 June 1830)

References

Notes

1828 births
1843 deaths
Andong Kim clan
Royal consorts of the Joseon dynasty
Korean queens consort
19th-century Korean women
Korean posthumous empresses